A Business Buccaneer is a 1912 American short silent comedy film. It was the fifth time Earle Foxe and Alice Joyce had worked together that year.

Cast

 Tom Moore as Tom Hopewell
 Alice Joyce as Agnes
 Earle Foxe as Hastings
 Cleo Madison
 Stuart Holmes

External links
 

1912 films
American silent short films
1910s romantic comedy films
American black-and-white films
American romantic comedy films
Kalem Company films
1912 short films
1912 comedy films
1910s American films
Silent romantic comedy films
Silent American comedy films